The Kaj Schmidt Memorial is an architectural landmark commemorating a Danish sailor who drowned in 1930 trying to save the life of a white girl. It is located at Elliot's Beach in Chennai, Tamil Nadu, India. The monument was in a derelict state, but has recently been restored.

History

According to historians, Kaj Schmidt, who had gone to the beach, saw an English girl getting into the water who soon started struggling against the tide. In a successful attempt to save her life, he lost his own. The English girl, who Schmidt saved from the sea, attended a party the following evening as though nothing had happened. The then governor, who was apparently angry with her, built the memorial to mark Schmidt's gallant act.

The memorial

According to experts, the structure, which was built using bricks, lacks a stone foundation. The uneven base and the sea water have caused damage to the memorial over the years.

The memorial is the only heritage structure on Elliot's Beach. The memorial stone in the memorial reads, "To commemorate the gallantry of Kaj Schmidt who was drowned near this spot on December 30, 1930 while helping to save the lives of others."

At the initiative of an 87-year-old lady, in March 2013, the Corporation of Chennai announced that it would restore the memorial. In connection with the planned restoration of the memorial, the Chennai Corporation announced on 4 February 2014 that it plans to utilize Fiber Wrapping Technology to reinforce the structure. The restoration was done by IIT Madras and REACH Foundation.

Until 2030, this memorial has to survive so as to get a heritage tag. As of 2018, there is an enclosure around the memorial, and the cracks in the structure have been mended. However, there is still a lot of graffiti on the white surface, and people regularly climb the structure to take selfies. There are no security guards to discourage such actions.

Cult classic Malayalam movie, Nadodikattu, which revolves around two impecunious young men, Ramdas (Mohanlal) and Vijayan (Sreenivasan) who not being able to find any job in Kerala, plan to immigrate to Dubai to make their fortunes, but get deceived by Gafoorkka and end up in this spot. Thus the spot has become an iconic place for Keralites.

Gallery

References

External links
Ramjee's Learning: he Kaj Schmidt Memorial
Chennai Metblogs » Schmidt Memorial
img_1386.jpg (1024x648 pixels)
SPARKing a civic movement

Monuments and memorials in Chennai